IMT may refer to:
 IMT, the IATA code for Ford Airport (Iron Mountain), Michigan, US
 In Melbourne Tonight, an Australian TV show
 Individual Movement Techniques
 International Military Tribunal
 Institute for Military Technology at Royal Danish Defence College
 An abbreviation of the word, immortality

Organizations 
 IMT Gallery, an art gallery in London, UK
 Immortals, an American esports organization
 Industry of Machinery and Tractors, a Serbian producer and vendor of tractors and agricultural machinery
 Institut de Mathématiques de Toulouse
 Institut Mines-Télécom, a French public institution for higher education and research
 Inter Moengotapoe, a Surinamese football club
 FK IMT, a Serbian football club
 International Marxist Tendency
 Islamic Movement of Turkestan

Science, technology and health 
 IMT-2000, mobile telecommunications specifications
 Information manipulation theory, an interpersonal communication theory dealing with deceptive messages
 Intelligent manual transmission, its acronym is usually stylized as iMT.
 Interactive machine translation, a sub-field of computer-aided translation
 Intima-media thickness, a measurement of the thickness of artery walls. Also expressed: Carotid intimal-medial thickness.